Compañía Boliviana de Transporte Aéreo Privado Aerosur, S.A. (shortened and styled AeroSur) was a privately owned airline from Bolivia, which served as the country's flag carrier since 1998, along with state-owned Boliviana de Aviación. Headquartered in Santa Cruz de la Sierra, it operated a network of domestic and international scheduled passenger flights with its hub at the city's Viru Viru International Airport. As of 2010, the airline had 1200 employees.

History

Foundation and background 
AeroSur was established in April 1992, following the deregulation of the Bolivian airline market, which previously had been controlled by state-owned Lloyd Aéreo Boliviano. Revenue flights on regional routes were commenced on August 24 of that year, using an initial fleet of Fairchild Swearingen Metroliner and British Aerospace 146 aircraft. The airline's first flight was from Santa Cruz to Potosí.

Over the following years, larger Boeing 727-200 airliners were acquired, allowing for a growth of network size and passenger numbers.

Further expansion in the 21st century 

During the 2000s AeroSur renewed and expanded its fleet, introducing larger aircraft of the types Boeing 747 and Boeing 757, which made the inauguration of long-haul flights possible. In 2002, President Hugo Banzer declared the airline the flag carrier of the Republic of Bolivia (línea aérea bandera), in that very year AeroSur became the first airline in Bolivia to offer business and first class flights. In 2004, AeroSur had started to operate nostalgic flights with a Douglas C-117 to tourist destinations such as the Salar de Uyuni and Rurrenabaque, both of which are internationally recognized. 

When Lloyd Aéreo Boliviano went bankrupt in 2007, AeroSur became the largest airline of Bolivia and the only one with intercontinental flights (to Central and North America as well as to Europe). Since 2009, the domestic fleet of ageing Boeing 727s is replaced by more modern, though second-hand purchased Boeing 737 Classic airliners, and looked to start a Peruvian subsidiary, however that project was suspended indefinitely.

The subsidiary dubbed AeroSur Paraguay was planned to operate two Boeing 737-200 aircraft of mainline AeroSur. The further development of the project was postponed in mid-2009 pending Paraguayan governmental approval, and later deferred indefinitely. In 2010, AeroSur added five new aircraft to its fleet: three Boeing 737-300s, one Boeing 737-400 and a Boeing 767-200ER.

Bankruptcy
On March 31, 2012, the airline suspended operations because of unpaid taxes, but resumed all flights on  April 6, except for its Madrid route. AeroSur had used a 747 leased from Virgin Atlantic on that route but had returned it to the lessor. The airline planned to resume that route with an ex-Aerolíneas Argentinas 747-400. Ultimately, AeroSur struggled to keep its operations running smoothly and returned its 767 aircraft to the lessor.

On May 17, 2012 AeroSur suspended all its flights again, and other airlines such as state-owned Boliviana de Aviación have since begun to fill the void left by AeroSur. The airline was in talks with potential US investor William Petty who signed a memorandum of understanding to invest up to US$15 million in the Bolivian carrier. AeroSur's air operator's certificate was revoked on July 20, 2012. A group of former employees, as well as William Petty, planned to create a new airline called TU Aerolínea, but, as of 2018, nothing had happened as far as that venture.

Subsidiaries

The airline had two subsidiaries:

AeroSur Cargo
AeroSur had freight transport service nationwide and international with direct shipments. AeroSur did not operate any dedicated cargo aircraft, but used the cargo holds of its passenger aircraft for network-wide freight transport.

AeroSur Paraguay
AeroSur Paraguay was a brand of its parent company which was trying to become a future airline based at the Silvio Pettirossi International Airport, in Asunción, Paraguay and to be a subsidiary of the Bolivian airline. Unfortunately, the brand could never be consolidated as one legitimate and legally operational airline, it only became the name for one of the Bolivian airline's aircraft that has already been withdrawn from its fleet due to the financial problems that afflict one of the most important private airlines in Bolivia in recent years.

Destinations

AeroSur's destination network was organized around Viru Viru International Airport from where it offered services to various cities in South America, as well as direct flights to Miami and Madrid.

Fleet

Last fleet

As of November 2011, the AeroSur fleet consisted of the following aircraft:

Fleet development
Over the years, AeroSur operated the following aircraft types:

Accidents and incidents
On 31 December 1997, an AeroSur Fairchild Swearingen Metroliner (registered CP-2321) was substantially damaged when it veered off the runway at Teniente Jorge Henrich Arauz Airport. The two pilots had lost control of the aircraft during take-off run. There were no notable injuries amongst the 18 passengers on board.

Awards and recognitions
2008: Named Most Powerful Brand among Bolivian airlines by PricewaterhouseCoopers.
2009: Awarded one Bizz Award as Inspiring Company.

Contributions
AeroSur also greatly supported the sport, especially football, where it created the Copa Aerosur and la Copa AeroSur del Sur and in mid 2009, the AeroSur Futsal Cup was organized for the first time, where CRE and AeroSur from Bolivia, River Plate of Argentina and President Hayes of Paraguay, in which the host team AeroSur won.

Many street signs amongst others in Cochabamba, such as the signs for C. Mexico street, were financed by AeroSur and to this day still bear the Airline's name.

References

External links
 
 

Defunct airlines of Bolivia
Airlines established in 1992
Airlines disestablished in 2012
Latin American and Caribbean Air Transport Association
2012 disestablishments in Bolivia
Bolivian companies established in 1992
Defunct companies of Bolivia